KREF-FM (94.7 MHz) is a commercial radio station located in Oklahoma City, Oklahoma. KREF-FM airs a sports format branded as "94.7 The Ref". Owned by iHeartMedia, its transmitter is located in Northeast Oklahoma City, and studios are located at the 50 Penn Place building on the Northwest side.

Prior stations on 94.7 in Oklahoma City
The current KREF-FM license is the third to operate on 94.7 in Oklahoma City.

KOCY-FM
The first was KOCY-FM, which was the first FM station to broadcast in the state, opening on September 16, 1946. Initially broadcasting on 98.5 MHz, KOCY-FM was co-owned with KOCY (1340 AM). KOCY-FM quickly increased its effective radiated power, to 3,000 watts in January 1947; it changed frequencies to 94.7 in mid-1947.

A year later, KOCY-FM activated a new transmitter site and increased its power to 70,000 watts, claiming "the tallest exclusive FM tower in the world". KOCY-FM was additionally used to feed eight AM stations in a statewide network that began operations in September.

KOCY-FM ceased operations in 1950. Its tower was acquired by station KOMA (1520 AM) for use in broadcasting television.

KEFM/KMWC
It would be another eight years before a new 94.7 station operated; on August 17, 1958, Carl E. Williams opened KEFM, offering a "fine music" format. The fine music outlet was hit with staff turmoil in 1960 when it moved to a more upbeat music policy during the daytime hours; former station manager Earl Thomas claimed no involvement with the change.

1963 saw an even larger change; the station moved to Midwest City and adopted new KMWC call letters to reflect its home. KMWC, along with KJEM-AM-FM, carried daily radio broadcasts from Tinker Air Force Base. However, Williams made an ill-advised move; he leased the station for six months in 1964 to Marlin Joe Pershall without Federal Communications Commission approval. In March 1965, the FCC fined Williams $1,000. Later that year, the station was deleted, and the FCC set aside the fine that December.

History

KEBC
The Electronic Broadcasting Company applied on October 9, 1965, to build a new FM radio station on 94.7 in Oklahoma City. The FCC approved its application for a construction permit on August 17, 1966, and KEBC—named for the owner—signed on in May 1967. The station was a country music outlet, broadcasting from studios at 3920 SE 104th Street on the city's southeast side; in 1970, the studios were moved to 830 SW 31st Street.

In 1971, Ralph Tyler and Harold McEwen bought a majority share in KEBC, and a new tower facility followed in 1973. KEBC established itself as a force in the market; it pulled double-digit ratings in each year between 1979 and 1982, fighting with KKNG and KTOK for the top spot in Oklahoma City. However, KEBC gained a formidable competitor on May 27, 1982, when KXXY-FM flipped to country. The more aggressive KXXY-FM edged ahead of KEBC in 1983 and would widen its lead to eight ratings points by the end of the decade.

While KXXY-FM surged, KEBC was sold several times. Van Wagner Broadcasting, which only owned two outlets in Michigan, bought the station from Ralph Tyler for $4 million in 1986. Two years later, Van Wagner sold KEBC to Independence Broadcasting for $3.9 million. Independence would see a return on its investment when Clear Channel Communications, forerunner to iHeartMedia, acquired KEBC for $7.5 million in 1993.

Alternative, soft rock, and alternative again, plus sports

After 28 years in the country format, KEBC relaunched on July 3, 1996 as an alternative rock station known as "95X", adopting the call letters KNRX. It was the market's first station in the format. However, less than 18 months later, another change came. On November 7, 1997, after repeating the song "A Change Would Do You Good" by Sheryl Crow for an hour, KNRX became soft adult contemporary KQSR, seeking to target the 35–44 audience and citing the duplication of alternative music on stations in other formats in Oklahoma City.

The station returned to alternative on July 8, 2002 and became KHBZ-FM "The Buzz", stunting beforehand with a buzzing noise played over the soft rock songs and notifying listeners that their "technicians were working to get 'the Buzz' out". Starting with the 2006-07 NBA Basketball season, KHBZ also served as the flagship station for the New Orleans/Oklahoma City Hornets Basketball team replacing sister station KTOK that served as the Hornets flagship station for the 2005-06 NBA season. On January 11, 2008, at 5 p.m., the station began stunting with all-Metallica, relaunching the following Monday with an active rock format. Despite a format emphasizing active rock and some classic rock titles, KHBZ-FM was still placed on the alternative rock panel by Radio & Records/Nielsen BDS.

By the spring of 2009, KHBZ had adopted Clear Channel's syndicated Premium Choice active rock format, becoming musically identical outside of morning drive to sister stations KIOC in Beaumont, Texas and WHRL in Albany, New York.

The Brew
On December 29, 2009, KHBZ flipped to 1980s-based classic rock, branded as "The Brew." With the flip, the station changed call letters to KBRU. The station's initial slogan was "Classic Rock's Next Generation".

Since adopting the "Brew" moniker, KBRU shifted between rock formats on several occasions. In 2012, the station began playing more recent titles, bringing it closer to the music mix heard on the former KHBZ; later in the year, the station added more classic rock titles, eventually moving fully to classic rock as a competitor to KQOB. Since 2015, when the station moved back to mainstream rock, KBRU had oscillated between classic and mainstream rock formats.

94.7 The Ref
On August 18, 2021, after playing "The End" by The Doors, KBRU flipped to sports, branded as "94.7 The Ref", under new KREF-FM call letters. For overnight programing, the station simulcasts Fox Sports Radio along with other sports stations in the OKC radio market. KGHM, KREF in Norman, and KZLS in Enid.

KREF-FM, along with the other iHeart stations in Oklahoma City, simulcasts audio of KFOR-TV if a tornado warning is issued within the Oklahoma City metro area.

Translators

KREF-FM's only translator carries its HD2 subchannel, a regional Mexican format known as El Patrón.

References

External links

REF-FM
Sports radio stations in the United States
Radio stations established in 1967
IHeartMedia radio stations
1967 establishments in Oklahoma